Mario Petkov (born 4 December 1996) is a Bulgarian footballer who currently plays as a defender for Lokomotiv Sofia.

Career
On 4 September 2017, Petkov was loaned to Second League club Tsarsko Selo.

Career statistics

Club

References

External links

Living people
1996 births
Bulgarian footballers
Association football defenders
PFC Slavia Sofia players
FC Dunav Ruse players
FC Tsarsko Selo Sofia players
FC Lokomotiv 1929 Sofia players
First Professional Football League (Bulgaria) players
Footballers from Sofia